Carina Cassøe Krüth (born 27 July 1984) is a Danish equestrian athlete. Cassøe Krüth competed at several World Championships for Young Dressage Horses. In 2018 she became 4th in the seven years old final with Heiline's Danciera. One year later she made her international debut in the international Grand Prix with the black mare, but in 2020 they made their breakthrough in international dressage by scoring over the 80%.

Cassøe Krüth represented Denmark at the Olympic Games in Tokyo, finishing fourth with the team and 7th in the individual final.

Cassøe Krüth won a team gold medal at the 2022 World Championships, which were held in Herning, Denmark.

References

1984 births
Living people
Danish female equestrians
Danish dressage riders
Equestrians at the 2020 Summer Olympics
Olympic equestrians of Denmark
People from Slagelse
Sportspeople from Region Zealand